The 2014 Delaware State Hornets baseball team represented Delaware State University in the sport of baseball during the 2014 college baseball season.  The Hornets competed in NCAA Division I and the Eastern Division of the Mid-Eastern Athletic Conference (MEAC). The team is coached by J. P. Blandin, who entered his fourteenth season at Delaware State. The Hornets looked to build upon their appearance in the 2013 MEAC baseball tournament, where they were eliminated after losing after two straight games in the tournament, the first to North Carolina A&T and then Bethune–Cookman.

Departures

Roster

Schedule

|- align="center" bgcolor="#ffddd"
| February 22 ||  || || Dover, Delaware || 5–6 || Brucker (1–0) || Candeloro (0–1) || || 81 || 0–1 ||
|- align="center" bgcolor="#ddffdd"
| February 22 ||  || || Dover, Delaware || 1–0 || Sharff (1–0) || Bryson (0–2) || || 69 || 1–1 || 
|- align="center" bgcolor="#ddffdd"
| February 23 || Iona || || Dover, Delaware || 8–7 || Sharff (2–0) || Pucillo || || 62 || 2–1 || 
|- align="center" bgcolor=
| February 26 ||  || || Washington, D.C. || colspan=7| Postponed
|- align="center" bgcolor="#ddffdd"
| February 27 || George Washington || || Washington, D.C. || 7–5 || Gonzalez (1–0) || Milon (0–1) || Sharff (1) || 34 ||  3–1 || 
|- align="center" bgcolor="#ddffdd"
| March 1 ||  || || Dover, Delaware || 4–0 || McClain (1–0) || Valek || || 44 || 4–1 || 
|- align="center" bgcolor="#ddffdd"
| March 2 || Akron || || Dover, Delaware || 13–1 || Michael (1–0) || Steensen || || 47 || 5–1 ||
|- align="center" bgcolor="#ffddd"
| March 3 || Akron || || Dover, Delaware || 10–11 || Beaver (2–0) || Sharff (2–1) || || 39 || 5–2 ||
|- align="center" bgcolor=
| March 5 ||  || || Dover, Delaware || colspan=7 | Postponed
|- align="center" bgcolor="#ddffdd"
| March 9 ||  || || Dover, Delaware || 13–7 || McClain (2–0) || Hopf (1–1) || || 61 || 6–2 ||
|- align="center" bgcolor="#ddffdd"
| March 9 || Saint Peter's || || Dover, Delaware || 8–6 || Michael (2–0) || Leiter (0–2) || Sharff (2) || 46 || 7–2 ||
|- align="center" bgcolor="#ddffdd"
| March 10 || Saint Peter's || || Dover, Delaware || 6–3 || Brown (1–0) || Morris (0–3) || || 38 || 8–2 || 
|- align="center" bgcolor="#ffddd"
| March 11 ||  || || Dover, Delaware || 1–4 || Thomson (1–0) || Candeloro (0–2) || Reitcheck (1) || 28 || 8–3 ||
|- align="center" bgcolor="#ffddd"
| March 11 || Penn || || Dover, Delaware || 9–17 || Hartman (1–0) || Evans (0–1) || || 49 || 8–4 ||
|- align="center" bgcolor="#ddffdd"
| March 15 ||  || || Norfolk, Virginia, || 12–1 || McClain (3–0) || Bhatti (1–4) || || 211 || 9–4 || 1-0
|- align="center" bgcolor="#ffddd"
| March 15 || Norfolk State || || Norfolk, Virginia || 1–2 || Outman (2–1) || Michael (2–1) || Fulgo (1) || 211 || 9–5 || 1-1
|- align="center" bgcolor="#ddffdd"
| March 16 || Norfolk State || || Norfolk, Virginia || 18–8 || Candeloro (1–2) || Vales (1–3) || || 130 || 10–5 || 2-1
|- align="center"
| March 18 || George Washington || || Dover, Delaware || colspan=7 | Cancelled
|- align="center" bgcolor="#ffddd"
| March 20 ||  || || Annapolis, Maryland || 1–12 || McCormick (1–1) || Thomas (0–1) || || 72 || 10–6 || 
|- align="center" bgcolor="#ddffdd"
| March 22 ||  || || Dover, Delaware || 16–1 || McClain (4–0) || Burgess || || 51 || 11–6 || 3-1
|- align="center" bgcolor="#ffddd"
| March 22 || Coppin State || || Dover, Delaware || 6–7 || Roberts || Gonzalez (1–1) || || 48 || 11–7 || 3-2
|- align="center" bgcolor="#ffddd"
| March 23 || Coppin State || || Dover, Delaware || 6–8 || O'Brien || Brown (1–1) || || 67 || 11–8 || 3-3
|- align="center" bgcolor="#ddffdd"
| April 1 ||  || || Dover, Delaware || 16–9 || Thomas (1–1) || Gomez (1–1) || || 48 || 12–8 || 
|- align="center" bgcolor="ffddd"
| April 2 ||  || || Towson, Maryland || 1–4 || Patton (2–2) || Candeloro (1–3) || Gonnella (5) || 185 || 12–9 ||
|- align="center" bgcolor="#ddffdd"
| April 5 || Norfolk State || || Norfolk, Virginia, || 14–10 || Thomas (2–1) || Jones (0–3) || || 210 || 13–9 || 4-3
|- align="center" bgcolor="ffddd"
| April 5 || Norfolk State || || Norfolk, Virginia || 5–7 || Bhatti (2–4) || Sharff (2–2) || Haynes (1) || 210 || 13–10 || 4-4
|- align="center" bgcolor="#ddffdd"
| April 6 || Norfolk State || || Norfolk, Virginia || 19–10 || Candeloro (2–3) || Butt (1–2) || || 178 || 14–10 || 5-4
|- align="center" bgcolor="#ddffdd"
| April 8 || Towson || || Dover, Delaware || 4–3 || Sharff (3–2) || Gonnella (1–2) || || 103 || 15–10 ||
|- align="center" bgcolor="ffddd"
| April 9 || UMBC || || Baltimore|| 5–17 || Applegate (1–2) || Thomas (0–1) || || 106 || 15–11 ||
|- align="center" bgcolor="#ddffdd"
| April 12 || Coppin State || || Anne Arundel, Maryland || 10–1 || McClain (5–0) || Devilme || || 65 || 16–11 || 6-4
|- align="center" bgcolor="#ddffdd"
| April 12 || Coppin State || || Anne Arundel, Maryland || 15–7 || Sharff (4–2) || O'Brien || || 65 || 17–11 || 7-4
|- align="center" bgcolor="#ddffdd"
| April 13 || Coppin State || || Anne Arundel, Maryland || 15–5 || Michael (3–1) || Burgess || || 51 || 18–11 || 8-4
|- align="center" bgcolor=
| April 15 ||  || || Philadelphia, Penn. ||colspan=7|Cancelled
|- align="center" bgcolor="ffddd"
| April 18 ||  || || Dover, Delaware || 2-3(11) || Parker (1–0) || Sharff (4–3) || Repine (3) || 69 || 18–12 || 8-5
|- align="center" bgcolor="ffddd"
| April 18 || UMES || || Dover, Delaware || 1–5 || Parker (2–0) || Thomas (2–2) || || 57 || 18–13 || 8-6
|- align="center" bgcolor="#ddffdd"
| April 19 || UMES || || Dover, Delaware || 16–6 || Michael (4–1) || Berry (1–5) || || 84 || 19–13 || 9-6
|- align="center" bgcolor="#ddffdd"
| April 19 || UMES || || Dover, Delaware || 15–8 || Mordecai (1–0) || Black || || 124 || 20–13 || 10-6
|- align="center" bgcolor="#ddffdd"
| April 23 || Navy || || Dover, Delaware || 13–8 || Sharff (5–3) || Sorenson (1–3) || || 77 || 21–13 ||
|- align="center" bgcolor="#ddffdd"
| April 26 || Norfolk State || || Dover, Delaware || 8–5 || McClain (6–0) || Hemmerich (3–3) || Sharff (3) || 119 || 22–13 || 11-6
|- align="center" bgcolor="#ddffdd"
| April 26 || Norfolk State || || Dover, Delaware || 4–2 || Thomas (3–2) || Outman (5–2) || || 88 || 23–13 || 12-6
|- align="center" bgcolor="#ddffdd"
| April 27 || Norfolk State || || Dover, Delaware || 16–8 || Michael (5–1) || Vales (1–5) || || 133 || 24–13 || 13-6
|- align="center" bgcolor="ffddd"
| May 1 || Delaware || || Newark, Delaware || 8-9(13) || Geffre (1–4) || Evans (0–1) || || 180 || 24–14 ||
|- align="center" bgcolor="#ddffdd"
| May 3 || Coppin State || || Dover, Delaware || 8-7(10) || Sharff (6–3) || Roberts (2–2) || || 74 || 25–14 || 14-6
|- align="center" bgcolor="#ddffdd"
| May 3 || Coppin State || || Dover, Delaware || 6–0 || Thomas (4–2) || Davies (1–5) || || 69 || 26–14 || 15–6 
|- algin="center" bgcolor="ffddd"
| May 4 || Coppin State || || Dover, Delaware || 4–8 || Devilme (3–4) || Michael (5–2) || || 87 || 26–15 || 15-7
|- align="center" bgcolor="#ddffdd"
| May 9 || UMES || || Princess Anne, Maryland || 8–3 || McClain (7–0) || Parker (2–1) || || 85 || 27–15 || 16-7
|- align="center" bgcolor="#ddffdd"
| May 9 || UMES || || Princess Anne, Maryland || 5–3 || Thomas (5–2) || Smith (2–7) || Sharff (4) || 95 || 28–15 || 17-7
|- align="center" bgcolor="#ddffdd"
| May 10 ||  || || Dover, Delaware || 8–7 || Gonzalez (2–1) || Martinez (1–3) || || 158 || 29–15 ||
|- align="center" bgcolor="#ddffdd"
| May 10 || New York Tech || || Dover, Delaware || 10–7 || Galati (1–0) || Plotkin (1–7) || || 107 || 30–15 ||
|-

|- align="center" bgcolor="ffddd"
| May 14 || (4S)  || (1N) || Norfolk, Virginia || 4–8 || Ricks (5–4) || Michael (5–3) || || 208 || 30–16 ||
|- align="center" bgcolor="ffddd"
| May 15 || (3N) Coppin State || (1N) || Norfolk, Virginia || 1–6 || O'Brien (2–2) || Gonzalez (2–2) || || 152 || 30–17 ||
|-

References

Delaware State
Delaware State Hornets baseball seasons
Horn